The Shire of Wangaratta was a local government area about  northeast of Melbourne, the state capital of Victoria, Australia. The Shire did not include Wangaratta itself, which was governed by a separate local government.

History

Wangaratta was first incorporated as the North Ovens Road District on 10 June 1863, which became a shire on 17 September 1867. Part of the Mokoan Riding of the Shire of Benalla was annexed as the Killawarra Riding on 31 May 1906. The shire was renamed Wangaratta on 22 November 1916.

On 18 November 1994, the Shire of Wangaratta was abolished, and along with the City of Wangaratta, the Shire of Oxley and various surrounding districts, was merged into the newly created Rural City of Wangaratta.

Wards

Wangaratta was divided into four ridings, each of which elected three councillors:
 Boorhaman Riding
 Central Riding
 Killawarra Riding
 Tarrawingee Riding

Towns and localities
 Boorhaman
 Boralma
 Bowser
 Eldorado
 Everton
 Killawarra
 Londrigan
 Peechelba
 Springhurst
 Tarrawingee

Population

* Estimate in the 1958 Victorian Year Book.

References

External links
 Victorian Places - Wangaratta Shire

Wangaratta Shire